Stuorajávri is a lake in Alta Municipality in Troms og Finnmark county, Norway.

See also
List of lakes in Norway

References

Alta, Norway
Lakes of Troms og Finnmark